Mönkhbatyn Myagmarjargal (born 3 March 1992) is a Mongolian boxer. She competed in the women's middleweight event at the 2020 Summer Olympics.

References

External links
 

1992 births
Living people
Mongolian women boxers
Olympic boxers of Mongolia
Boxers at the 2020 Summer Olympics
People from Övörkhangai Province
21st-century Mongolian women